The Saxon Highlands and Uplands refer to a natural region mainly in the south of Saxony with small elements also in southeast Thuringia and northeast Bavaria. It comprises, from (south)west to (north)east, of the Vogtland, the Ore Mountains, Saxon Switzerland, the Upper Lusatian Plateau and the Zittau Hills.

The amalgamation of several major geographical units by the working group for Ecological balance and Regional Character at the Saxon Academy of Sciences in Leipzig, that includes a break-up of the old natural region of  Oberlausitz, has not been fully recognised officially, because this division has not yet been accepted by federal authorities like the Bundesamt für Naturschutz (BfN), but does broadly follow the logic of other groupings such as that of the Thuringian-Franconian Upland which border it to the west and includes the Thuringian Forest, Thuringian Highland, Franconian Forest and Fichtelgebirge.

Whilst the Thuringian-Franconian Upland, like the adjacent Upper Palatine-Bavarian Forest run from northwest to southeast, these low Saxon mountains generally run from west-southwest to east-northeast. The Vogtland, whose German section lies mainly in the natural region in the Free State of Saxony that gives it its name, forms the actual link to the Thuringian-Franconian Upland.

The new internal subdivisions of the Ore Mountains have since been adopted by the BfN.

Natural sub-divisions 
The following list shows the current division of natural regions. Main geographical units according to Meynen and the BfN are shown with an asterisk (*).

 Saxon Highlands and Uplands
 41 (=D17) Vogtland* (partly in Thuringia)
 410 East Thuringian-Vogtland Plateau 
 411 Middle Vogtland Peak District
 412 Upper Vogtland 
 Elstergebirge
 42 (=D16) Ore Mountains*
 Western Ore Mountains
 Middle Ore Mountains
 Eastern Ore Mountains
 43 (=D15) Saxon-Bohemian Chalk Sandstone Region* 
 430 Saxon Switzerland
 431 Zittau Mountains (German part of the Lusatian Mountains which also stretch into the Czech Republic)
 to 44 (=D14) Mountainous part of Upper Lusatia*
 441 Upper Lusatian Plateau

Alternative sub-divisions according to Meynen and BfN 
The older division of the Ore Mountains into major units by Meynen is as follows (in brackets their location within the new classification):

 42 (=D16) Ore Mountains (Erzgebirge)
 420 Southern foothills of the Ore Mountains (extreme southwest of the Western Ore Mountains)
 421 Upper Western Ore Mountains (Western Ore Mountains apart from the extreme southwest and extreme northeast, southern part of the Middle Ore Mountains)
 422 Upper Eastern Ore Mountains (southern part of the Eastern Ore Mountains) 
 423 Lower Western Ore Mountains (Extreme northeast of the Western Ore Mountains, north and centre of the Middle Ore Mountains) 
 424 Lower Eastern Ore Mountains (North and centre of the Eastern Ore Mountains)

See also 
 Natural regions of Germany

Sources 
 Map of the natural regions in Saxony at www.umwelt.sachsen.de (pdf, 859 kB)
 BfN
 Map services
 Landscape fact files
 Vogtland
 Upper levels of the East Thuringian-Vogtland Plateau and the Middle Vogtland Peak District
 Upper Saale Valley
 Northern East Thuringian-Vogtland Plateau (excluding lake district)
 Plothen Lake District
 Ronneburg Arable and Mining Region (Northeastern East Thuringian-Vogtland Plateaus)
 Lower levels of the Middle Vogtland Peak District
 Intermediate levels of the Upper Vogtland
 Lower levels of the Upper Vogtland
 Ore Mountains (Erzgebirge)
 Southern foothills of the Ore Mountains
 Upper levels of the northern foothills of the Western and Middle Ore Mountains
 Lower levels of the Western Ore Mountains
 Lower levels of the Middle Ore Mountains 
 Upper levels of the Eastern Ore Mountains
 Lower levels of the Eastern Ore Mountains
 Tharandt Forest (northern part of the Eastern Ore Mountains)
 Kreidesandsteingebiet und Oberlausitz
 Saxon Switzerland (excluding the Elbe Valley)
 Upper Elbe Valley
 Upper Lusatian Plateau
 Zittau Hills

Natural regions of Saxony
Highlands
Natural regions of the Central Uplands